A  is a Japanese and ancient Chinese longitudinal, end-blown flute that is made of bamboo.

The  flourished in the 18th century during the Edo period, and eventually the  also died out.

The  is traditionally made of bamboo, but versions now exist in ABS and hardwoods.

The instrument is tuned to the minor pentatonic scale.

Etymology

The name  means "1.8 ", referring to its size. It is a compound of two words:
 is an archaic unit of length equal to ) and subdivided in ten subunits.

Other  vary in length from about 1.3  up to 3.6 .

Overview

Much of the 's subtlety (and player's skill) lies in its rich tone colouring, and the ability for its variation. Different fingerings, embouchures and amounts of  can produce notes of the same pitch, but with subtle or dramatic differences in the tone colouring. Holes can be covered partially and pitch varied subtly or substantially by changing the blowing angle. The  pieces rely heavily on this aspect of the instrument to enhance their subtlety and depth.

Unlike a recorder, where the player blows into a duct—a narrow airway over a block which is called a "fipple"—and thus has limited pitch control, the  player blows as one would blow across the top of an empty bottle (though the  has a sharp edge to blow against called ) and therefore has substantial pitch control. The term  literally translates as "to the mouth that sings", referring to the upper and main hole of the flute where the mouthpiece or blowing edge is created by a natural diagonal cut in the bamboo.

Thus, the Kinko Ryu, Myoan and Tozan Ryu, differ in different features in their line of mouthpiece design, coinciding in them the total non-use in their inlay of the semi-circumference formed by the natural cut of the mouthpiece in the bamboo. Beyond the fact that these inlaid forms were a hallmark of styles and schools, the fact of inlaying a mouthpiece historically could respond to a way of repairing the instrument due to wear or damage in particular in its blowing edge.

The  has a range of two full octaves (the lower is called / , the upper) and a partial third octave though experienced players can produce notes up to E7 (2637.02Hz) on a 1.8 shakuhachi. The various octaves are produced using subtle variations of breath, finger positions and embouchure.

In traditional  repertoire, instead of tonguing for articulation like many Western wind instruments, hitting holes with a very fast movement is used and each note has its corresponding repeat fingerings; e.g., for repeating C5 the 5th hole (D5's tone hole) is used.

A 1.8  produces D4 (D above Middle C, 293.66Hz) as its fundamental—the lowest note it produces with all five finger holes covered, and a normal blowing angle. In contrast, a 2.4  has a fundamental of A3 (A below Middle C, 220Hz). As the length increases, the spacing of the finger holes also increases, stretching both fingers and technique. Longer flutes often have offset finger holes, and very long flutes are almost always custom made to suit individual players. Some , in particular those of the Nezasaha (Kimpu-ryū) school, are intended to be played on these longer flutes.

Due to the skill required, the time involved, and the range of quality in materials to craft bamboo , one can expect to pay from US$1,000 to US$8,000 for a new or used flute. Specimens of extremely high quality, with valuable inlays, or of historical significance can fetch US$20,000 or more. Plastic or PVC  have some advantages over their traditional bamboo counterparts: they are lightweight, extremely durable, nearly impervious to heat and cold, and typically cost less than US$100.  made of wood are also available, typically costing less than bamboo but more than synthetic materials. Nearly all players, however, prefer bamboo, citing tonal qualities, aesthetics, and tradition.

History

The  is derived from the Chinese bamboo-flute. The bamboo-flute first came to Japan from China during the 7th century. This style of bamboo flute, also called , was used for playing , but died out in the 10th century. Eight  remain in the Shōsō-in Treasure Repository.

In the 15th century, the  appeared. It is characterized by a single bamboo joint in the middle of the tube. Although it flourished in the 17th century, it gradually fell into disuse due to the development and popularity of the superior , and was no longer used by the 19th century.

Their songs (called ) were paced according to the players' breathing and were considered meditation as much as music.

In return, some were required to spy for the shogunate, and the  sent several of his own spies out in the guise of Fuke monks as well. This was made easier by the  that the Fuke wore over their heads, a symbol of their detachment from the world.

In response to these developments, several particularly difficult  pieces, e.g. , became well known as "tests": if one could play them, they were a real Fuke monk. If they could not, they were probably a spy and might very well be killed if they were in unfriendly territory.

With the Meiji Restoration, beginning in 1868, the shogunate was abolished and so was the Fuke sect, in order to help identify and eliminate the 's holdouts. Non-Fuke folk traditions did not suffer greatly from this, since the tunes could be played just as easily on another pentatonic instrument. However, the  repertoire was known exclusively to the Fuke sect and transmitted by repetition and practice, and much of it was lost, along with many important documents.

It was not until later that  were allowed to be played publicly again as solo pieces.

The  has traditionally been played almost exclusively by men in Japan, although this situation is rapidly changing. Many teachers of traditional  music indicate that a majority of their students are women. The 2004 Big Apple  Festival in New York City hosted the first-ever concert of international women  masters. This festival was organized and produced by Ronnie Nyogetsu Reishin Seldin, who was the first full-time  master to teach in the Western hemisphere. Nyogetsu also holds 2 Dai Shihan (Grand Master) licenses, and has run KiSuiAn, the largest and most active  Dojo outside Japan, since 1975.

The  has grown in international popularity in recent decades. The first non-Japanese person to become a  master was American-Australian Riley Lee. Lee was responsible for the World  Festival being held in Sydney, Australia over 5–8 July 2008, based at the Sydney Conservatorium of Music.

Acoustics
The  creates a harmonic spectrum that contains the fundamental frequency together with even and odd harmonics and some blowing noise. Five tone holes enable musicians to play the notes D-F-G-A-C-D. Cross (or fork) fingerings, half-covering tone holes, and  blowing cause pitch sharpening, referred to as intonation anomaly. Especially the second and third harmonic exhibit the well-known  timbre. Sound radiating from several holes and the natural asymmetry of bamboo create an individual spectrum in each direction. This spectrum depends on frequency and playing technique.

Notable players

The International Shakuhachi Society maintains a directory of notable professional, amateur, and teaching  players.

Recordings

The primary genres of  music are:

  (traditional, solo)

Recordings in each of these categories are available; however, more albums are catalogued in categories outside the traditional realm. As of 2018,  players continue releasing records in a variety of traditional and modern styles.

The first  recording appeared in the United States in the late 1960s. Gorō Yamaguchi recorded A Bell Ringing in the Empty Sky for Nonesuch Explorer Records on LP, an album which received acclaim from Rolling Stone at the time of its release. NASA later chose to include this track as part of the Golden Record aboard the Voyager spacecraft.

In the film industry
 are often used in modern film scores, for example those by James Horner. Films in which it is featured prominently include: The Karate Kid parts II and III by Bill Conti, Legends of the Fall and Braveheart by James Horner, Jurassic Park and its sequels by John Williams and Don Davis, and The Last Samurai by Hans Zimmer and Memoirs of a Geisha by John Williams.

Western contemporary music

 The Australian  Master and composer Jim Franklyn has composed a number of works for solo , also including electronics.
 American composer and performer Elizabeth Brown plays  and has written many pieces for the instrument that build on Japanese traditions while diverging with more modern arrangement, orchestration, melodic twists or harmonic progressions.
 Composer Carson Kievman has employed the instrument in many works from "Ladies Voices" in 1976 to "Feudal Japan" in the parallel world opera "Passion Love Gravity" in 2020-21.
 Brian Ritchie of the Violent Femmes formed a Jazz quintet in 2002 called The N.Y.C.  Club. They play Avant-garde jazz versions of tradition American Folk and Blues songs with Ritchie's  playing as the focal point. In 2004 they released their debut album on Weed Records.
 Welsh composer Karl Jenkins features prominent  solos in his 2005 Requiem, specifically in the movements where the texts are death haikus.
 American multi-instrumentalist and composer Zac Zinger is a  specialist, featuring it on his progressive-jazz album Fulfillment, as well as playing it on the score of Just Cause 4 and the promotional album for Kamigawa: Neon Dynasty, from Magic: The Gathering.

Synthesized 

See also

 (a similar, end-blown bamboo flute)
List of shakuhachi players
Quena (a similar flute from South America)

Shakuhachi musical notation

References

Further reading
 Henry Johnson, The shakuhachi: roots and routes, Amsterdam, Brill, 2014
 Iwamoto Yoshikazu, The Potential of the Shakuhachi in Contemporary Music, “Contemporary Music Review”, 8/2, 1994, pp. 5–44
 Tsukitani Tsuneko, The shakuhachi and its music, in Alison McQueen Tokita, David W. Huges (edited by), The Ashgate Research Companion to Japanese Music 7, Aldershot, Ashgate, 2008, pp. 145–168
 Riley Lee (1992). "Yearning For The Bell; a study of transmission in the shakuhachi honkyoku tradition", Thesis, University of Sydney
 Seyama Tōru, The Re-contextualisation of the Shakuhachi (Syakuhati) and its Music from Traditional/Classical into Modern/Popular, “the world of music”, 40/2, 1998, pp. 69–84
 Zapata, Ricardo (2021). "Blow your mind Ride your tone; The conquest of shakuhachi discovering your inner singing", Ebook, Colombia, 2021

External links

International Shakuhachi Society

Shakuhachi flute Fingering Chart
Shakuhachi Online Study Program and Flute Store
Fuke Shakuhachi Official Site

End-blown flutes
Japanese musical instruments
 
Zen
Bamboo flutes
Five tone hole wind instruments
Fuke Zen